Qullmay is an Inca Empire archeological site with multiple buildings along a Granite cliff, assumed to be used for both administrative and religious practices. It is located in the Cusco Region, Anta Province, Chinchaypujio District at 3,436 m altitude. Qollmay is 4 km North-West (about a 25-minute drive on dirt road) from Chinchaypujio, on the way to the campesino community of Sumaru.

First excavated by Max Uhle in 1905 and registered by Ken Heffernan in 1986, it has been classified in 6 sectors and features about a dozen foundations, half a dozen well preserved walls and one well preserved walled-off natural cavern with Inca-style stonework inside, located within sector 1. This cavernous building is thought to be the most important one in the whole site. Adjacent to it is a rock formation reminiscent of a Birth canal, speculated to be the site of fertility rituals.

The site is embedded within Inca-made, rectangular terraces, now overgrown with grass.

See also 

 Killarumiyuq
 Tampukancha
Pumawasi Cave
Chinchaypujio District

Further reading 

 Geo Patrimonio Cusco - Detailed Archaeological Map of Qollmay

References 

Archaeological sites in Cusco Region
Rock art in South America
Archaeological sites in Peru
Archaeological sites in Peru by region